Kemasik (est. pop. (2000 census): 1,896) is a mukim in Kemaman District, Terengganu, Malaysia. The town's major attraction is Kemasik Beach (Pantai Kemasik in Malay).

References 

Kemaman District
Mukims of Terengganu